Morten Nielsen (born 14 April 1971) is a retired Danish football defender.

References

1971 births
Living people
Danish men's footballers
Lyngby Boldklub players
F.C. Copenhagen players
RC Strasbourg Alsace players
En Avant Guingamp players
Danish Superliga players
Ligue 1 players
Association football defenders
Danish expatriate men's footballers
Expatriate footballers in France
Danish expatriate sportspeople in France
People from Kalundborg
Holbæk B&I players
Sportspeople from Region Zealand